CB slang is the distinctive anti-language, argot or cant which developed among users of Citizens Band radio (CB), especially truck drivers in the United States during the 1970s and early 1980s.

The slang itself is not only cyclical, but also geographical. Through time, certain terms are added or dropped as attitudes toward it change. For example, in the early days of the CB radio, the term "Good Buddy" was widely used.

Nicknames or callsigns given or adopted by CB radio users are known as "handles". Many truck drivers will call each other "Hand", or by the name of the company they are driving for.

CB and its distinctive language started in the United States but was then exported to other countries including Mexico, Germany and Canada.

Popular terms

Law enforcement officers and their equipment

Trucks and other non-police vehicles

Destinations

Other popular terms

See also
 Ten-code

Notes

External links

 
 Complete CB Slang Dictionary at cbslang.com

Lists of slang
Citizens band radio

fr:Citizen-band#Les codes « Q », code chiffre, abréviations